Gordon Frederick Cummins (18 February 1914 – 25 June 1942) was a British serial killer known as the Blackout Killer, the Blackout Ripper and the Wartime Ripper, who murdered four women and attempted to murder two others over a six-day period in London in February 1942. He is also suspected of committing two earlier murders in October 1941.

Convicted of the murder of 34-year-old Evelyn Oatley, Cummins was sentenced to death for her murder and was hanged at HMP Wandsworth on 25 June 1942.

Cummins became known as the "Blackout Killer" and the "Blackout Ripper" due to the fact he committed his murders during the imposed wartime blackout and because of the extensive mutilations inflicted upon three of his victims' bodies. He is also known as the "Wartime Ripper" as his murders were committed at the height of World War II.

The murders committed by Gordon Cummins have been described by one Detective Superintendent within the Metropolitan Police as "by far the most vicious" he ever investigated during his entire career.

Early life
Gordon Frederick Cummins was born in New Earswick, North Yorkshire on 18 February 1914, the first of four children born to John Cummins and his wife Amelia (née Lee). Cummins's father was a civil servant who ran a school for delinquent youths; his mother was a housewife. As a child, Cummins received a private education in Llandovery, South Wales, although contemporary reports from his years at the Llandovery County Intermediate Secondary School describe his academic performance as unremarkable, with teachers later recollecting Cummins was much more preoccupied with socializing than his studies. Nonetheless, Cummins did obtain a diploma in chemistry at age sixteen. After completing his schooling in 1930, Cummins attended Northampton College of Technology. He abandoned his studies on 1 November 1932.

At age 18, Cummins moved to Newcastle, where he briefly worked as an industrial chemist. He was dismissed from this job after five months. In August 1933, Cummins obtained employment as a tanner in Northampton, although he was fired from this employment for poor timekeeping after thirteen months, thereafter alternating between part-time work and casual labour. In October 1934, Cummins relocated to London, obtaining a job as a leather dresser in a clothing factory, earning £3 a week. He later trained to become a foreman at this firm.

While residing in London, Cummins developed a desire to live the life of an aristocrat. He frequented hotels and clubs in the West End of London, falsely claiming to acquaintances to be the illegitimate son of a peer and also claiming to receive an allowance from this fabled individual. To support this contention, Cummins refined his accent to imitate that of an Oxfordian, and insisted on being referred to as the Honourable Gordon Cummins. He also frequently engaged in acts of theft or embezzlement to financially maintain this facade, and regularly bragged to colleagues of his sexual excursions with local women. To his employers, his extravagant lifestyle impacted his work performance, and he was fired from his job on 8 February 1935. Shortly thereafter, Cummins moved into his brother's flat in Queens Mews, Bayswater, as he considered his next career move.

Royal Air Force
In early 1935, Cummins volunteered to join the Royal Air Force (RAF). He enlisted at the Air Crew Reception Centre in Regent's Park, London, where both serving members of the RAF and new recruits were assessed for training. Cummins initially trained as a rigger, tasked with undertaking flight checks on aircraft. His superiors considered Cummins to be an ambitious individual, although his boastful attitude and claims of nobility made him unpopular with his fellow servicemen. These false claims to hail from an aristocratic background earned Cummins the derogatory nickname "the Duke". In May 1936, he became acquainted with Marjorie Stevens, the secretary of a West End theatre producer. The two first met at an Empire Air Day air show in the village of Henlow. Following a seven-month courtship, the couple married at the Paddington Register Office on 28 December. The couple had no children.

Initially, Cummins was stationed with the Marine and Armament Experimental Establishment at Felixstowe, Suffolk. Between 1936 and 1939, he relocated with this military research and test organisation to Scotland. On 25 October 1939, shortly after the outbreak of World War II, Cummins was transferred to Helensburgh, Dunbartonshire. He remained stationed in Dumbartonshire until April 1941, when he was posted to Colerne, Wiltshire. At this posting, Cummins reached the junior rank of leading aircraftman, although he held aspirations to become a Spitfire pilot.

On 10 November 1941, Cummins was posted to Cornwall. At this new posting, his braggadocio among his fellow airmen earned him the nickname "the Count". While stationed in Cornwall, Cummins joined a Falmouth social club named the Blue Peter Club, and occasionally assisted the proprietress by tending the bar. However, he was relieved of his bartending duties within weeks when found to be serving free drinks to RAF personnel. Shortly thereafter, the proprietress discovered that approximately £35 worth of jewellery had been stolen from her apartment. Although both the proprietress and local police suspected Cummins of committing this theft, no evidence was found to prove his guilt.

The following January, having accrued over 1,000 hours of flight experience, he appeared before the Royal Air Force selection board to take an aviation exam. His exemplary performance earned him a transfer to the Air Crew Receiving Centre in Regent's Park, where he was to be stationed with 300 other men. Cummins was ordered to report for duty at 10 a.m. on 2 February 1942.

Murders
Cummins is known to have murdered at least four women and to have attempted to murder two others over a period of six days in February 1942. He is also suspected of murdering two further women in October 1941. The majority of his known victims were women whom he encountered in or near to West End pubs and clubs and who engaged in prostitution—typically with servicemen.

All of Cummins's known murders and attempted murders were committed during the city's imposed wartime blackout conditions, imposed in September 1939. By the time of his 1942 arrest, Cummins had neither a previous criminal record nor a known history of violence.

First suspected murders 
Cummins is suspected of committing his first two murders in October 1941. His first suspected victim was a 19-year-old clerk named Maple Churchyard, who was murdered on 13 October. Churchyard is known to have frequently engaged in casual sexual relations with servicemen. Her nude body was found by workmen in a bombed house on Hampstead Road the day after her murder. She had been strangled to death with her own camiknickers by an individual described by the pathologist who examined her body as being a left-handed individual, as the bruising around Churchyard's neck indicated her murderer had more strength in his left hand than his right. In addition, her handbag had been emptied, with several contents missing. Churchyard had not been sexually assaulted. Her death is believed to have occurred at approximately 9:15 p.m.

Four days later, on 17 October, a 48-year-old widow named Edith Eleanora Humphries was found lying upon her bed at her Regent's Park home. She had been extensively bludgeoned about the face and head before her assailant had attempted to strangle her before cutting her throat. Humphries had also suffered a single stab wound to her skull, which had penetrated her brain. Humphries was still alive, but died shortly after her admission to hospital. The door to her property was ajar, and investigators found no signs of a forced entry to her home. Several items of jewellery had been stolen.

At the time of these two murders, Cummins was stationed in Colerne, Wiltshire, although when on leave, he is known to have frequently visited London, residing at an address in nearby St John's Wood.

Blackout murders
On Sunday 8 February 1942, Cummins left an RAF establishment in St John's Wood to visit his wife at the flat they rented in Southwark. He borrowed a £1 note from his wife (the equivalent of approximately £60 ), explaining that he intended to visit the West End for a "night on the town". Cummins left his home shortly after 6:30 p.m.

Evelyn Margaret Hamilton
The following morning, the body of 41-year-old pharmacist Evelyn Hamilton was discovered by an electrician named Harold Batchelor in a street-level air raid shelter in Montagu Place, Marylebone. Her clothes had been disarranged and her scarf wound about her head. Scuff marks on her shoes and broken sections of mortar scattered near her body indicated Hamilton had fiercely struggled with her attacker, who had raised her skirt above her hips, pulled her underwear below knee level, and exposed her right breast. Her handbag—containing approximately £80—had been stolen, although some of the contents were found strewn about the pavement outside the air raid shelter. Hamilton's empty handbag was later found by a police officer on nearby Wyndham Street. No fingerprints were recovered from any of her possessions. Her body was identified by her landlady, Catherine Jones, on 10 February.

The day prior to her murder, Hamilton had resigned from her position managing a Hornchurch chemists, which had experienced financial hardships due to the onset of the war, and travelled to London via train. At 6:40 p.m. on 8 February, she is known to have informed a Mrs. Maud Yoxall of her plans to leave London and travel to Lincolnshire the following day, as she had been offered a manageress position at a pharmacy in Grimsby. She was last seen alive by a waitress at the Maison Lyons Corner House in Marble Arch shortly before midnight, drinking a glass of white wine to celebrate her 41st birthday. The location of her body led investigators to conclude she had been either accosted or attacked as she walked back to her boardinghouse in the early hours of the following morning. Hamilton's post-mortem revealed she had been manually strangled by a left-handed individual. She had not been sexually assaulted or mutilated, although numerous small cuts and scratches had been inflicted to her right breast and a cut measuring one inch had been inflicted to her left eyebrow.

Evelyn Oatley
Shortly after 8:30 a.m. on 10 February, two meter readers discovered the naked and mutilated body of 34-year-old Evelyn Oatley lying upon her bed in her flat at 153 Wardour Street, Soho. She had been beaten about the mouth and chest, then strangled into unconsciousness before a six-inch cut had been inflicted to her throat, severing her right carotid artery. Oatley's head hung over the edge of her bed. Her abdomen, genitals and thighs had been extensively sexually mutilated with a safety razor blade and a tin opener after death. Six of these wounds had been inflicted around her vaginal cavity, the jagged nature of which suggested they had been inflicted with the tin opener. Oatley had also been sexually violated with an electric torch, which protruded from her vagina. A pair of blood-smeared curling tongs was also found close to her body, and a bloodstained razor blade lay to the left of her head. In addition, the contents of Oatley's leather handbag were strewn across the floor of her bedroom, and seven unused Gillette safety razor blades were recovered from the small nightstand beside her bed. The door to her apartment had been closed, but not locked. No defensive wounds were found upon Oatley's hands, nails or arms.

Detective Chief Superintendent Frederick Cherrill was able to determine that fingerprints recovered from the bloodstained tin opener and upon the corner of a broken section of mirror found within Oatley's leather handbag which had also been used to mutilate her body indicated that her murderer was a left-handed individual. No match for this set of fingerprints could be found within the police fingerprint bureau, indicating Oatley's murderer had no police record.

Oatley was a married woman who, at the outbreak of World War II, had turned to prostitution, using the alias Nita Ward, to supplement the income she earned as a nightclub hostess. According to these witnesses, when Oatley had asked this individual what his sexual preferences were, he had simply replied, "I like blondes." Oatley was last seen alive by a fellow tenant of 153 Wardour Street named Ivy Poole, who observed her enter the stairwell to the property in the company of this individual at approximately 11:40 p.m. According to Poole, shortly after midnight, she was awoken by the sudden increase in the volume of Oatley's wireless. She did not investigate this disturbance.

Margaret Florence Lowe
In the early hours of Wednesday, 11 February, a 43-year-old prostitute named Margaret Florence Lowe was murdered in her flat at 11 Gosfield Street, Marylebone. She was last seen alive by her neighbour, Florence Bartolini, at approximately 1:15 a.m. walking along the corridor to her flat in the company of a client. Bartolini later heard the man exit Lowe's flat, walk down the corridor and onto Gosfield Street, whistling to himself. Lowe's body remained undiscovered until the afternoon of 13 February, when her 15-year-old daughter, Barbara, visited her mother only to be told by a neighbour her mother had not been seen for "two or three days" and that a parcel had remained unclaimed outside her door for the same length of time.

Lowe was found on her bed beneath the quilts, which were raised to just below her chin. She was on her back with her legs apart and her knees bent upwards. She had been extensively beaten, then strangled to death upon her divan bed with a silk stocking which was still knotted beneath the right side of her jaw. Froth was visible around her nose and mouth.

Upon examining Lowe's body, Forensic pathologist Sir Bernard Spilsbury remarked that the injuries inflicted by her murderer were "quite dreadful", adding that the perpetrator was "a savage sexual maniac" who "indulged in a wicked lust to perpetrate the most diabolical injuries on the women he killed". The mutilations inflicted to Lowe surpassed the savagery of those her murderer had inflicted upon Oatley, with some mutilations inflicted while the victim had still been alive, although at the point of death. Her body had been extensively slashed and mutilated with a variety of implements including a razor blade, a vegetable knife, a table knife and a poker, all of which were found protruding from or beside her body. Her abdomen had been opened, exposing her internal organs, with one further wound inflicted to the right side of her groin being "a deep, gaping wound" measuring ten inches in length. A large serrated bread knife protruded from a wound close to Lowe's groin, a wax candle had also been inserted six inches into her vagina, and her uterus had been slashed. Spilsbury was also able to determine the injuries inflicted to Lowe's body left little doubt her murderer had also been responsible for the death of Evelyn Oatley.

Forensic experts recovered fingerprints from the base of a glass candlestick holder standing upon the bedroom mantelpiece, plus a glass tumbler, and a half-drunk bottle of Hammerton's oatmeal stout also found at the crime scene. The fingerprints upon the glass candlestick holder were found to belong to the perpetrator's right hand, indicating the perpetrator was left-handed.

Lowe was a widowed mother of one who hailed from Southend-on-Sea. Following the death of her husband in 1932, Lowe had sold the family fancy-goods business. She later enrolled her daughter in a boarding school before relocating alone to London, where she obtained employment as a house cleaner in 1934. Shortly thereafter, using the alias Peggy Campbell, she began to engage in prostitution, although every third weekend, Barbara would travel to London from Southend via train to visit her mother, and Lowe would devote her weekend to social activities such as visiting the cinema and local landmarks with her daughter.

Catherine Mulcahy
On Thursday, 12 February, Cummins accosted a 25-year-old prostitute named Catherine Mulcahy in Regent Street. Mulcahy—who sold sex using the alias Kathleen King—agreed to take him to her flat in nearby Southwick Street. The two travelled to her flat via taxi, with Cummins giving her the agreed fee of £2 in advance. Upon entering her flat, Mulcahy lit her gas fire and began removing her clothes but did not remove her boots. She later stated a "strange smile" appeared on Cummins's face as she removed her clothing, lay upon her bed and beckoned him to join her. He removed his clothes, then approached Mulcahy, clambered atop her, slammed his knees into her stomach and attempted to strangle her as he pinned her body to the bed with his own weight. Mulcahy fought her attacker, kicking his stomach with her boot and breaking free of his grasp as Cummins fell to the floor beside her bed. Mulcahy then ran screaming from her flat to the house of a neighbour.

Possibly as a means of deterring Mulcahy from reporting the assault to police, Cummins partially dressed himself before approaching her neighbour's flat. He then gave her a further eight £1 notes, stating: "I'm sorry. I think I had too much to drink this evening" as Mulcahy repeatedly shrieked her belief he was a murderer. Cummins then grabbed his coat and fled, unwittingly leaving his RAF webbing belt at her address.

Doris Jouannet
Shortly after his assault upon Mulcahy, Cummins encountered 32-year-old Doris Jouannet (also known as Olga). Jouannet was last seen alive at approximately 10:20 p.m. on 12 February by a friend named Beatrice Lang, with whom she drank a shot of whiskey at a corner-house tearoom. According to Lang, Jouannet stated she intended to visit a regular client whom she referred to as "The Captain". The two then parted company on Oxford Street. Shortly thereafter, Jouannet encountered Cummins, accepted his proposal, and took him to the two-room ground-floor flat at 187 Sussex Gardens, Bayswater, that she shared with her husband.

The following evening, Doris's husband, Henri, returned to the flat he shared with his wife. Noting the bedroom door locked, he unsuccessfully attempted to pry the door open before phoning the police, who dispatched a constable named William Payne to the property.

Urging Henri to remain in the hallway, Payne pried the door open and turned on the light, discovering Jouannet's body—naked except for an open black nightgown—lying diagonally across the bed with her left hand placed between her legs. A silk stocking was knotted around her neck. Payne then exited the room, stating to Henri, "I must advise you not to go in that room". He then returned to the Paddington Police Station to request the station officer alert Scotland Yard's Criminal Investigation Department and the divisional surgeon to his discovery.

Divisional Detective Leonard Clare arrived at Sussex Gardens shortly after 8 p.m. His examination of the body at the crime scene revealed Jouannet's jaw had been broken before she had been strangled with the stocking knotted beneath the left side of her chin. Her abdomen, genitals, left breast, and thighs were extensively mutilated with a razor blade and knife in a similar manner to the bodies of Oatley and Lowe. One of the wounds inflicted was a six-inch vertical gash extending between her navel and genitalia; another wound inflicted to her vagina measured six-and-a-half inches. Furthermore, the flesh beneath her left breast had been carved away. The knife used to mutilate Jouannet had been placed on her thigh. Two used condoms lay on the floor beside the bed, and a gold watch and approximately £5 had been stolen from the flat.

Sir Bernard Spilsbury conducted Jouannet's autopsy at the Paddington Mortuary on 14 February. Via examining the spillage of blood from Jouannet's wounds, Spilsbury was able to determine the decedent had been strangled to the point of death before her murderer had first mutilated her breast and left thigh as she died. All other wounds had been inflicted after death. In reference to the nature of the wounds to the victim's body and the locations they had been inflicted, Spilsbury noted the murderer had exercised a degree of calculated restraint when disfiguring his victim above the navel, but that he had worked himself into an evident frenzy when mutilating her genitalia and thigh.

Jouannet was known to only occasionally resort to street level prostitution. She had married her husband—who had previously been a client of hers—in November 1935, and had remarked to other West End prostitutes that she would only sell sexual favours when she needed "a few extra shillings" to supplement the money given to her by her elderly husband, who managed a hotel in Sloane Square. She would engage in prostitution when her husband slept overnight at the hotel, as his employment frequently required him to do.

Press coverage
Due to wartime restrictions on newsprint, the murders committed by Cummins initially received only limited press coverage, largely because of the ongoing global conflict. Nonetheless, the murders quickly became the prime topic of conversation among West End prostitutes, many of whom became increasingly reluctant to offer their services to individuals they did not consider regular clients. On 13 February, the bodies of both Lowe and Jouannet were discovered just hours apart. Both murders were soon linked to the murder of Evelyn Oatley, and the perpetrator was dubbed by the press as the Blackout Killer. The murders became nationwide headlines.

Margaret Heywood
On the evening of 13 February 1942, Cummins accosted a young married woman named Margaret Heywood in Piccadilly. After sharing a drink and a sandwich at the London Trocadero, the two walked in the direction of Haymarket. Heywood later stated that, at this point, Cummins became "unpleasantly forward" toward her: pushing her into a doorway near Piccadilly Circus and groping her waist as he attempted to persuade her to accompany him to a nearby air raid shelter. Heywood consented to a single kiss before informing Cummins she did not know of any nearby air raid shelters, stating, "In any case, I wouldn't go in one with you." Cummins then began fondling Heywood, who remonstrated against his actions as she struck at his wrists and pushed his hands away from her body, then attempted to leave. In response, Cummins seized her by the throat and pushed her back into the doorway. Heywood was then strangled into unconsciousness as Cummins repeatedly muttered the words, "You won't".

As Cummins rifled through her handbag, he was disturbed by an 18-year-old delivery boy named John Shine, who was carrying bottles of drink into the nearby Captain's Cabin pub, forcing Cummins to flee the scene, leaving his RAF-issue gas mask and haversack in the doorway. Shine immediately ran to Heywood's assistance. Noting Heywood had regained consciousness, he then offered to accompany her to a hospital. En route, the couple encountered a policeman named James Skinner, who suggested the two accompany him to West End Central Police Station to provide witness statements detailing Heywood's attack before an officer accompanied her to a nearby hospital.

Immediately after his attack on Heywood, Cummins visited a nearby pub, where he realized he had left his gas mask and haversack at the site of the attempted murder, and that the service number printed inside his haversack could be traced to him. In an effort to concoct an alibi, he stole another airman's gas mask and haversack before returning to base.

Investigation
Prior to providing his witness statement at the West End Central Police Station, John Shine handed the gas mask and haversack to investigators, explaining he had recovered the items from the doorway where he had found Heywood, who insisted the items had been in the possession of her assailant. A Detective Sergeant named Thomas Shepherd noted the RAF Regimental number (525987) printed on the inside of the haversack. Shepherd immediately contacted the Royal Air Force Police, who in turn contacted Cummins's regiment in Regent's Park. A staff sergeant quickly ascertained the gas mask and haversack had been issued to Cummins. This information was relayed to Detective Sergeant Shepherd at 11:30 p.m. on 13 February, with the staff sergeant adding Cummins was not at his billet.

Arrest
Detective Sergeant Thomas Shepherd formally questioned Cummins on the morning of 14 February. He protested his innocence and claimed he had spent the evening drinking whiskey and bitter with a corporal whose name he could not recall at the Volunteer Public House in Baker Street before the two took a taxi to Shaftesbury Avenue. According to Cummins, he drank several shots of spirits at the bar before engaging in conversation with a woman. He further claimed to only hold hazy recollections of his conversations with this woman, due to his intoxication, although he did claim to have a "hazy recollection" of walking on the street in her company before realizing in the early hours he had violated his curfew, and immediately returned to his base. He claimed to have no memory of attacking Heywood, but expressed his regrets and offered to pay her compensation. Questioned as to why the knuckles upon his left hand were cut and bruised, Cummins claimed to have received the wounds while performing maintenance upon an airplane engine.

Immediately after Cummins provided a written statement of his account of the previous evening's events, he was arrested and held on remand upon a charge of causing grievous bodily harm.

Further enquiries
An examination of the entries within billet pass-book on 15 February indicated Cummins had reported back to the billet before 10:30 p.m. on the dates of the murders and attempted murders investigators had ascribed to the Blackout Killer. However, many entries had been written in lead pencil, meaning entries within the book could easily be manipulated. Furthermore, several of Cummins's entries for the month of February were incomplete, as although he had invariably signed the pass-book when leaving base, he had frequently failed to sign in upon his return. Questioning of Cummins's fellow airmen revealed they had been in the habit of vouching for each other's return to base, and that Cummins had spent extravagantly in the week prior to his arrest. Detective Chief Inspector Edward Greeno further discovered Cummins and another airman named Felix Sampson had left the billet via a fire escape after midnight on each of the dates in question, and both had not returned to base until the early hours of the morning.

A search of Cummins's possessions revealed he had taken various items belonging to the four murder victims linked to the Blackout Killer as keepsakes. One of the items had been a white metal cigarette case engraved with the initials L.W., which had belonged to Evelyn Oatley. This cigarette case was discovered hidden inside a kitchenette, alongside a photograph of Oatley's mother.
 Traces of blood were also recovered from a shirt retrieved from his kit bag, and the inner surface of his belt. Furthermore, an examination of the trouser turn-ups of Cummins's military uniform revealed traces of a distinctive brick dust mixture found at the air raid shelter in which Evelyn Hamilton's body was discovered. Chippings of this mortar were also recovered from Cummins's haversack.

Detective Chief Superintendent Frederick Cherrill was able to match the fingerprint of Cummins's left little finger and thumb with prints found upon the tin opener and broken mirror found near the body of Evelyn Oatley. Cherrill later confirmed fingerprints recovered from two other crime scenes belonged to Cummins. Two of the ten £1 banknotes Catherine Mulcahy's attacker had given her before and after he had assaulted her were brand new. Via tracing the serial number of these banknotes, Detective Chief Inspector Edward Greeno was further able to determine these two notes had been issued to Cummins on 12 February.

Both Heywood and Mulcahy were later asked to view a police lineup to identify their attacker. Mulcahy was unable to positively identify her attacker, although Heywood unhesitantly identified Cummins as the man who had assaulted her. Cummins continued to protest his innocence, claiming Heywood was mistaken and that another airman must have switched his own gas mask and haversack with his, and may have left the items at the site of the attempted murder in an effort to frame him.

Formal murder charges
On 16 February, Edward Greeno drove to HM Prison Brixton to interview Cummins, who recounted his movements between 9 and 13 February. He insisted he had never encountered any of the murder victims, and claimed to be unable to recognise their photographs. When presented with the victims' personal belongings recovered among his own possessions, Cummins claimed the items had been "taken from a service respirator case I was carrying when arrested, but which was not mine". He then recounted his claim that he had either picked up the wrong haversack, or that another airman had switched his own gas mask and haversack with his. Unconvinced of Cummins's claims, Greeno informed him he was to be charged with the murders of Oatley, Lowe, and Jouannet the following morning. He was held on remand at HM Prison Brixton, to await trial.

Cummins was further charged with assaulting Heywood and Mulcahy on 20 February. On 27 March, Cummins again appeared before a judge at Bow Street Magistrates' Court. On this occasion, he was further charged with the murder of Evelyn Hamilton.

Trial

The trial of Gordon Cummins for the murder of Evelyn Oatley began at the Old Bailey on 24 April 1942. He was tried before Mr Justice Asquith Cummins entered a plea of not guilty to the charge against him; the clerk then informed the jury: "The prisoner at the bar, Gordon Frederick Cummins, is charged upon indictment with the murder of Evelyn Oatley on the tenth day of February this year. To this indictment he has pleaded that he is not guilty. It is your charge to say, having heard the evidence, whether he be guilty or not."

The prosecution consisted of Christmas Humphreys K.C. and G. B. McClure, K.C., with Denis Nowell Pritt K.C. initially appointed to defend Cummins. However, owing to a legal technicality on the first day of the trial (the presentation to the jury of crime scene photographs of victim Margaret Florence Lowe), the jury was excused from duty. The trial restarted before a new jury on 27 April, the defence now consisting of John Flowers K.C. and Victor Durand K.C. Cummins himself seemed uninterested in the legal proceedings; occasionally chatting in a light-hearted manner with his lawyers or turning from the bar to smile and wave at his wife, who steadfastly believed in his innocence.

Witness testimony

In his opening statement on behalf of the prosecution, Humphreys outlined the discovery of Oatley's body, the injuries inflicted to her body, the weapons her murderer had used to perform the mutilations, and the fingerprints recovered at the crime scene. Referring to the prosecution's intention to link Cummins to this murder by the fingerprints investigators had recovered, Humphreys stated: "You will hear from one of the greatest experts in the country upon fingerprints. He will tell you that there have been some half-million fingerprints taken in this time and there have never been two alike. The prosecution would ask you to say, each one of you, that you are satisfied, on the evidence which will be called before you, and nothing else, that this man is the man who murdered Mrs. Oatley on the tenth of February."

The first witnesses to testify on behalf of the prosecution was Detective Chief Superintendent Frederick Cherrill, who stated he was prepared to publicly stake his reputation the fingerprints found upon the tin opener and broken mirror at the crime scene which had been used to extensively mutilate Oatley's body belonged to Cummins. Cherrill repeated this claim during cross-examination from John Flowers, who contended the fingerprint upon the tin opener was too faint to determine a precise identification, stating the quality of the fingerprint was typical for a fingerprint left upon a metal surface, and that any individual who touched the same surface would leave a fingerprint impression of the same quality. In response to further questioning as to discrepancies in the distance between points of identification upon the enlarged photographs of Cummins's fingerprints and those retrieved at the crime scene on display in the courtroom, Cherrill stated the points of discrepancy would appear "very great in an enlarged photograph", adding that original fingerprints can extend up to four millimetres depending on the degree of pressure to which they are subjected.

Sir Bernard Spilsbury followed Cherrill into the witness box to testify as to the autopsy he had conducted upon Oatley's body. Spilsbury testified the cause of death had been the deep cut to her throat, that Oatley would have bled to death in less than five minutes, and that death had occurred at approximately 12:30 a.m. on the morning of the discovery of her body, although the actual time of her death could have been up to two hours before or after this time.

Felix Sampson then testified that between 10:30 and 11 p.m. on the night of Oatley's disappearance, he and Cummins had accosted two prostitutes outside the Monico Restaurant in Piccadilly Circus. The two had agreed to reconvene outside the restaurant after "taking care of business". Sampson testified he had arrived back outside the restaurant at approximately 11:30 p.m. and had waited roughly 25 minutes for Cummins to appear before walking alone to a local pub. He had arrived back at St John's Wood at approximately 6 a.m., only to find Cummins asleep. When he later asked Cummins what time he had arrived back at the billet, Cummins had replied "about half-past three or four" in the morning, adding: "The woman I went with didn't satisfy me, so I went and found someone else."

Defendant's testimony

Cummins chose to testify in his own defence on 27 April. He denied any culpability in Oatley's murder; insisting he had been in the company of another woman on 10 February before returning to his billet. In reference to the previous testimony of Felix Sampson, Cummins admitted to having lied in his statement to Detective Chief Inspector Edward Greeno that he and Sampson had reconvened outside the Monico Restaurant at approximately 10 p.m., adding the primary reason was that he had been afraid because Greeno had intimidated him in his initial questioning on 16 February, stating to him: "We have a rope around your neck, and we are going to hang you with it" after he had admitted having been in Oatley's company shortly before her murder, but had insisted she had been alive and well when he had last seen her. He also claimed to have been too drunk on the evening of her death to recall the actual timing of his whereabouts or actions, adding: "I had not a watch, myself. And, of course, in the dark, one cannot see public clocks."

Both counsels presented their closing arguments to the jury on 28 April. Upon completion of both counsels' closing arguments, Mr Justice Asquith delivered his final instructions to the jury. This address lasted for more than an hour, with the judge outlining key points presented by both prosecution and defence. At 4 p.m., the jury retired to consider their verdict.

Conviction
The jury returned their verdict at 4:35 p.m., having deliberated for just 35 minutes. Each juror avoided making eye contact with Cummins as they filed back into the courtroom. When asked by the court clerk as to their verdict, the foreman replied, "Guilty of murder." Cummins displayed no emotion as the verdict was read aloud, although his wife burst into tears. He was then asked whether he had any legal reason or cause as to why the court should not impose the penalty of death. In response, Cummins replied, "I am completely innocent, sir."

Cummins was then formally sentenced to death by hanging. Upon imposing this sentence, Mr Justice Asquith stated: "Gordon Frederick Cummins, after a fair trial you have been found guilty, and on a charge of murder. As you know, there is only one sentence which the law permits me to pronounce, and that is you be taken from this place to a lawful prison, and thence to a place of execution, and that you there be hanged by the neck until you are dead. And may God have mercy on your soul."

Execution
Following his conviction, Cummins was held in a condemned cell at Wandsworth Prison, to await execution. He voiced no concern over his predicament, although he did lodge an appeal against his conviction. His appeal was rejected by the Lord Chief Justice in early June 1942.

Gordon Cummins was executed by Albert Pierrepoint at Wandsworth Prison on 25 June 1942. Contemporary news reports indicate Cummins was given a glass of brandy to calm his nerves. He then walked stoically to the scaffold, flanked by two warders, without offering any resistance. The entire execution process lasted less than two minutes. Cummins's execution was conducted during a German air raid upon London. He is the only convicted murderer in British criminal history known to have been executed during an air raid.

Cummins protested his innocence to the end. His wife and family were unwavering in their belief of his innocence, and visited him on a frequent basis until the day of his execution. Cummins's body was buried within the confines of the prison.

Charges relating to the other three Blackout Killer murders remained on the file. Scotland Yard investigators later stated they strongly believed Cummins had murdered all four women, in addition to the two women murdered in October 1941 while he had been stationed in Colerne prior to his November 1941 posting to Cornwall.

Media

Literature

Television
 The Crime & Investigation Network have broadcast an episode focusing on the Blackout Murders as part of their Murder Casebook series. Presented by Fred Dinenage, this 45 minute episode was first broadcast in November 2012 and features interviews with criminologist David Wilson.

See also

 Capital punishment in the United Kingdom
 HM Prison Wandsworth
 List of executioners
 List of serial killers by number of victims
 List of serial killers in the United Kingdom

Notes

References

Cited works and further reading
 Aston, Mark (2005), Foul Deeds and Suspicious Deaths in Hampstead, Holburn and St Pancras, Barnsley: Wharncliffe Books, 
 Bell, Amy (2014), Murder Capital: Suspicious deaths in London, 1933–53, Manchester: Manchester University Press, 
 Blundell, Nigel (1996), Encyclopedia of Serial Killers, London: Promotional Reprint Company Ltd, 
 
 Gaute, J. H. H. (1991), The New Murderers' Who's Who, New York: Dorset Press, 
 Gordon, Michael (2018), Murder Files from Scotland Yard and the Black Museum, North Carolina: Exposit Books, 
 
 Hutton, Michael (2012), The Story of Soho: The Windmill Years 1932-1964, Gloucestershire: Amberley Publishing, 
 Lane, Brian (1995), Chronicle of 20th Century Murder, Bournemouth: Select Editions, 
 
 Legg, Penny (2017), Crime in the Second World War: Spivs, Scoundrels, Rogues and Worse, Sevenoaks: Sabrestorm Publishing, 
 Morris, Jim (2015), The Who's Who of British Crime: In the Twentieth Century, Stroud: Amberley Publishing, 
 
 
 
 
 Thomas, Donald (2004), The Enemy Within: Hucksters, Racketeers, Deserters, and Civilians During the Second World War, New York: New York University Press,

External links
 Contemporary news article detailing the murder charges filed against Gordon Cummins
 Contemporary news article detailing the crimes and conviction of Gordon Cummins
 2012 The Press news article regarding the Blackout Ripper murders
 British Executions case file pertaining to Gordon Cummins
 Crime & Investigation webpage pertaining to the Blackout Ripper
 PressReader article detailing the murders committed by Gordon Cummins
 The Blackout Ripper  at oldpolicecellsmuseum.org.uk

1914 births
1940s murders in London
1941 in London
1941 murders in the United Kingdom
1942 deaths
1942 in London
1942 murders in the United Kingdom
20th-century English criminals
20th-century executions by England and Wales
Criminals from Yorkshire
English people convicted of murder
English serial killers
English spree killers
Executed people from North Yorkshire
Executed spree killers
Murder in London
People convicted of murder by England and Wales
People executed for murder
People from York
Royal Air Force airmen
Royal Air Force personnel of World War II
Violence against women in England